Juan Paco Gonzalez (born March 17, 1945 in Yahualica, Jalisco, Mexico) is an American Thoroughbred horse racing trainer.

Life
The fourth of six children, Paco Gonzalez grew up on a ranch  near Guadalajara where his family owned Quarter horses. As a boy he was inspired to go into the Thoroughbred racing business by two older brothers who were jockeys at Agua Caliente Racetrack in Tijuana. In 1964, Paco Gonzalez followed his brothers north to California where he found work as a stable hand for trainer Joe Manzi under whom he would learn the business for the next twenty-five years.

Career
Joe Manzi died in April 1989  and Gonzalez took over as trainer of the stable whose clients included John Toffan and Trudy McCaffery, Canadian friends who raced as a partnership. For Toffan and McCaffrey and/or with other partners, the soft-spoken and reserved Paco Gonzalez enjoyed considerable success as the trainer of millionaire multiple Grade I winners Bien Bien, Free House, and Came Home.
 Bien Bien won the 1992 Hollywood Turf Cup Stakes, the 1993 Hollywood Invitational Turf Handicap, and the 1994 San Juan Capistrano Invitational Handicap before retiring with earnings of US$2,498,370. Bien Bien sired millionaire Bienamado whom Gonzalez trained and who in 2000/2001 won the same three major races as his sire had. 
 Free House retired with earnings of more than US$3.1 million having won major races such as the 1997 Santa Anita Derby, 1998 Pacific Classic Stakes, and 1999 Santa Anita Handicap. He also ran third in the Kentucky Derby, second by a nose in the Preakness Stakes, and third in the Belmont Stakes. 
 Came Home earned US$1,835,940. His wins included the 2001 Hopeful Stakes and the 2002 Santa Anita Derby  and Pacific Classic Stakes.

Among other runners conditioned by Paco Gonzalez, Del Mar Dennis won three straight editions of the San Bernardino Handicap between 1994 and 1996. As well, the Gonzalez-trained filly Pacific Squall won the Grade I Hollywood Oaks in 1992.

Trudy McCaffery died in early 2007 and Paco Gonzalez continues to train horses on a smaller scale for John Toffan and wife, Cheryl.

References
 June 5, 1997 New York Times article on J. Paco Gonzalez
 May 3, 2002 St. Petersburg Times article titled "Juan "Paco" Gonzalez, one of the most successful Latin American trainers, prefers to avoid the national spotlight."
 Paco Gonzalez at the NTRA

1945 births
Living people
American horse trainers
People from Arcadia, California
Mexican emigrants to the United States
People from Yahualica, Jalisco